Still Brazy is the second studio album by American rapper YG. It was made available for streaming on June 14, 2016, by Apple Music. Later, it was released physically for the digital download purchases on June 17, 2016, by 4Hunnid Records, CTE World and Def Jam Recordings. The album features production handled by Swish, P-Lo, Terrace Martin, Larrance Dopson, CT Beats, Ty Dolla Sign and Hit-Boy, while YG enlisted the collaborators such as Lil Wayne, Drake, Nipsey Hussle and Slim 400, among others.

Still Brazy was supported by three singles: "Twist My Fingaz", "FDT" and "Why You Always Hatin?" The album received widespread acclaim from critics and debuted at number six on the US Billboard 200, earning 38,000 album-equivalent units in its first week. It was certified gold by the Recording Industry Association of America (RIAA).

Promotion
To promote the album release, YG released the track, "I Wanna Benz", was released on December 12, 2015. The song features guest appearances from American rappers Nipsey Hussle and 50 Cent, with production was provided by London on da Track. The track also premiered by Oliver El-Khatib on the twelfth episode of OVO Sound Radio. The album was made available for streaming on June 14, 2016. Later, it was released physically for the digital download purchases on June 17.

Singles
The lead single from the album, "Twist My Fingaz", was released on July 16, 2015. The song was produced by Terrace Martin.

The second single from the album, "FDT" (stylized for "Fuck Donald Trump"), was released on March 30, 2016. The song features a guest appearance from American rapper Nipsey Hussle, with production was provided by Swish. Much of the original lyrics in the single version was censored and replaced with newer verses on the album, after YG revealed the government contacted his label regarding the song. On July 20, 2016, YG released a remixed version of the track, "FDT Part 2". The song features guest appearances from American rappers G-Eazy and Macklemore.

The third single from the album, "Why You Always Hatin?", was released on May 21, 2016. The song premiered by Oliver El-Khatib on OVO Sound Radio. The song features guest appearances from Canadian rapper Drake and American rapper Kamaiyah, with production was handled by CT Beats.

Promotional singles
The album's first promotional single, "Still Brazy", was released on June 3, 2016, alone with an accompanied music video. The track was produced by Ty Dolla Sign and Swish.

The album's second promotional single, "Word Is Bond", was released on July 29, 2016, alone with an accompanied music video. The song features a guest appearance from American rapper Slim 400, with production was handled by P-Lo.

Critical reception

Still Brazy was met with widespread critical acclaim. At Metacritic, which assigns a normalized rating out of 100 to reviews from mainstream publications, the album received an average score of 83, based on 14 reviews. Aggregator AnyDecentMusic? gave it 7.7 out of 10, based on their assessment of the critical consensus.

David Jeffries of AllMusic said, "A heavy album that doesn't pander to what's PC, what's on the radio, or what safe, suburban America believes." Martín Caballero of The Boston Globe said, "Here, it's less about what Y.G. does than how he does it; digging deeper into vintage G-funk flavors with a blend of personal, party, and political tracks, the young Compton rapper takes a sizzling step forward." Michael Madden of Consequence of Sound said, "It's full of the kind of warm G-funk that never fails to transport you to the part of the country it belongs to." Exclaim!s Themistoklis Alexis gave the album a positive review, writing that it succeeds in "evoking the crown jewels of West Coast hip-hop royalty." Trent Clark of HipHopDX said, "Still Brazy is a testament that real-life experience breeds the best music but we can do without the shootouts from this point on."

Grant Rindner of PopMatters said, "No one out there is crafting visceral street tales like he is, and if he could just trim his track lists a bit, he has the talent to make a gangster rap classic in the future." Patrick Taylor of RapReviews said, "While most of the album is concerned with asserting that YG is still a G despite his fame, it closes with a trio of protest songs." Jon Caramanica of The New York Times said, "Still Brazy is an artisanal, proletarian Los Angeles gangster rap record, less tribute to the sound's golden age than a full-throated and wholly absorbed recitation." Sheldon Pearce of Pitchfork said, "Still Brazy solidifies YG as a torch-bearer for west coast gangster rap." Sam C. Mac of Slant Magazine said, "Make no mistake—musically and lyrically, this is an expansion." Drew Millard of Spin said, "YG has gone and done himself one better, creating a record that stands tall alongside the full-lengths he once mined."

Accolades

Commercial performance 
Still Brazy debuted at number six on the Billboard 200, earning 38,000 album-equivalent units, (including 28,000 copies in pure albums sales) in its first week. It marked YG's second top ten debut on the chart. On July 22, 2020, the album was certified gold by the Recording Industry Association of America (RIAA) for combined sales and album-equivalent units of over 500,000 units in the United States.

Track listing
Credits were adapted from the album's liner notes.

Notes
 signifies a co-producer
 signifies an additional producer
 "Who Shot Me?" contains additional vocals by Chelsea Davis, Knock Squared, and Paloma Ford
 "Gimmie Got Shot" contains additional vocals by Nano and Tanea

Personnel
Credits for Still Brazy adapted from AllMusic.

 Jay 305 – featured artist
 Zachary Acosta – mixing assistant
 AD – featured artist
 Derek "MixedByAli" Ali – mixing
 Matt Anthony – engineer
 Bricc Baby – featured artist
 Marley Blu – featured artist
 Dee Brown – engineer
 Matt Burnette-Lemon – package design
 Burnt Out – featured artist
 Miriah Renee Carey – vocals
 Steve Carless – executive producer
 Vincent Cohran – vocals
 Dashone Wright – vocals
 Chelsea Davis – vocals
 Neil Denning – engineer
 Larrance Dopson – keyboards
 Drake – featured artist
 Duce – featured artist
 Paloma Ford – vocals
 Kenneth Gayton – vocals
 Chris Gehringer – mastering
 Tyquan Givens – vocals
 Hit-Boy – producer
 The Homegirl – featured artist
 Nipsey Hussle – featured artist
 Keenon Jackson – executive producer 
 Ulysses Jackson – vocals
 Brandon Jones – vocals
 Kamaiyah – additional production, featured artist
 Nye Lee Jr. – assistant executive producer,  vocals
 Ro Lexx – photography
 Lil' Wayne – featured artist
 Travis Margis – engineer
 Terrace Martin – keyboards, producer
 Marquis Medina – vocals
 Mike Miller – cover photo
 Brandon Moore – keyboards
 Joe Moses – featured artist
 Caroline Bentley Noble – vocals
 P-Lo – producer
 Adam Pena – engineer
 Sad Boy – featured artist
 Sickamore – executive producer
 Slim 400 – featured artist
 Knock Squared – vocals
 Swish – keyboards, producer
 Syke 800 – featured artist
 Ty Dolla Sign – producer
 Marlon Williams – guitar
 Traysha Williams – vocals
 YG – primary artist, vocals

Charts

Weekly charts

Year-end charts

Certifications

References

YG (rapper) albums
Def Jam Recordings albums
Albums produced by Terrace Martin
2016 albums
G-funk albums